Wenfei Fan  is a Chinese-British computer scientist and professor of web data management at the University of Edinburgh. His research investigates database theory and database systems.

Education
Fan was educated at Peking University (BS, MS) and the University of Pennsylvania where he was awarded a PhD in Computer Science for research supervised by Peter Buneman and Scott Weinstein in 1999.

Career and research
After his Ph.D. in 1999, he remained in the USA but joined University of Edinburgh in 2004 as a Reader. In 2006, he became Professor of Web Data Management at the university.

Fan has made fundamental contributions to both theory and practice of data management. He has both formalised the problems of querying big data and has developed radically new techniques that overcome the limits associated with conventional database systems.  His work has been adopted in the telecommunications industry for analyzing massive data sets that defied their current technology. In addition, Fan has made seminal contributions to data quality, in which he devised new techniques for data cleaning that have found wide commercial adoption. He has also contributed to our  understanding of semi-structured data.

Awards and honors
Fan won the Roger Needham Award in 2008 and is a Fellow of the Royal Society of Edinburgh and a Fellow of the Association for Computing Machinery (ACM)., and a member of Academia Europaea (MAE). and was elected a Fellow of the Royal Society (FRS) in May 2018.

 Foreign member of the Chinese Academy of Sciences, 2019.
 Fellow of the Royal Society (FRS), 2018
 Royal Society Wolfson Research Merit Award (2018)
 2017 SIGMOD Research Highlight Award (2018)
 Best Paper Award for SIGMOD 2017
 VLDB conference 2017 Best Demo Award 
 European Research Council (ERC) Advanced Fellowship, 2015
 Alberto O. Mendelzon Test-of-Time Award for ACM PODS 2015
 ACM Fellow, 2012
 Fellow of the Royal Society of Edinburgh (FRSE), 2011
 National Professor of the Thousand-Talent Program, 2010, China
 Alberto O. Mendelzon Test-of-Time Award for ACM PODS 2010
 Best Paper Award at the VLDB conference 2010
 The Roger Needham Award, 2008, UK
 Best Paper Award for ICDE 2007
 Changjiang Scholar, 2007, China
 Best Paper of the Year Award for Computer Networks, 2002
 The Career Award, 2001, USA

References 

Living people
Academics of the University of Edinburgh
Fellows of the Association for Computing Machinery
Fellows of the Royal Society of Edinburgh
Fellows of the Royal Society
Year of birth missing (living people)
Foreign members of the Chinese Academy of Sciences
Chinese computer scientists
British computer scientists
Chinese emigrants to the United Kingdom
Peking University alumni
University of Pennsylvania alumni
Academic staff of Beihang University